XX gonadal dysgenesis is a type of female hypogonadism in which no functional ovaries are present to induce puberty in an otherwise normal girl whose karyotype is found to be 46,XX. With nonfunctional streak ovaries, she is low in estrogen levels (hypoestrogenic) and has high levels of FSH and LH. Estrogen and progesterone therapy is usually then commenced.

This syndrome is inherited as an autosomal disease. It affects both males and females, but the phenotype differs. In both sexes, sensorineural deafness occurs, but in females ovarian dysgenesis also occurs.

The term "pure gonadal dysgenesis" (PGD) has been used to distinguish a group of patients from gonadal dysgenesis related to Turner syndrome. In the latter a distinct chromosomal aberration is present, while in PGD the chromosomal constellation is either 46,XX or 46,XY. Thus XX gonadal dysgenesis is also referred to as PGD, 46 XX, and XY gonadal dysgenesis as PGD, 46,XY or Swyer syndrome. Patients with PGD have a normal chromosomal constellation but may have localized genetic alterations.

Presentation

Related conditions 

XX gonadal dysgenesis is related to the Swyer syndrome in as much as both conditions have the same phenotype and clinical issues; however in Swyer syndrome the karyotype is 46,XY, and thus gonadectomy is recommended.

In Turner syndrome there is a demonstrable abnormality in or absence of one of the sex chromosomes that is the cause of the development of  gonadal dysgenesis. In contrast XX gonadal dysgenesis has a normal female chromosome situation.

Another type of XX gonadal dysgenesis is known as 46,XX gonadal dysgenesis epibulbar dermoid, which follows the similar symptoms as the regular syndrome, though it also shows signs of epibulbar dermoid (eye disorder). It has been suggested to be a new type of syndrome.

Pathogenesis 
The cause of the condition is often unclear. There are cases where abnormalities  in the FSH-receptor have been reported. Apparently either the germ cells do not form or interact with the gonadal ridge or undergo accelerated atresia  so that at the end of childhood  only a streak gonad is present, unable to induce pubertal changes. As girls' ovaries produce no important body changes before puberty, there is usually no suspicion of a defect of the reproductive system until puberty fails to occur.

Familial cases of XX gonadal dysgenesis are on record.

In one family mutations in the mitochondrial histidyl tRNA synthetase have been described as the cause.

Diagnosis 
Because of the inability of the streak gonads to produce sex hormones (both estrogens and androgens), most of the secondary sex characteristics do not develop. This is especially true of estrogenic changes such as breast development, widening of the pelvis and hips, and menstrual periods. Because the adrenal glands can make limited amounts of androgens and are not affected by this syndrome, most of these girls will develop pubic hair, though it often remains sparse.

Evaluation of delayed puberty usually reveals the presence of pubic hair, but elevation of gonadotropins, indicating that the pituitary is providing the signal for puberty but the gonads are failing to respond. The next steps of the evaluation usually include checking a karyotype and imaging of the pelvis. The karyotype reveals XX chromosomes and the imaging demonstrates the presence of a uterus but no ovaries (the streak gonads are not usually seen by most imaging). At this point it is usually possible for a physician to make a diagnosis of  XX gonadal dysgenesis.

Treatment 
The consequences to the girl with XX gonadal dysgenesis:
 Her gonads cannot make estrogen, so her breasts will not develop and her uterus will not grow and menstruate until she is given estrogen. This is often given through the skin now.
 Her gonads cannot make progesterone, so her menstrual periods will not be predictable until she is given a progestin, still usually as a pill.
 Her gonads cannot produce eggs so she will not be able to conceive children naturally. A woman with a uterus but no ovaries may be able to become pregnant by implantation of another woman's fertilized egg (embryo transfer).

History

Perrault syndrome
In 1951, Perrault reported the association of gonadal dysgenesis and deafness, now called Perrault syndrome. Currently, mutations in 6 different genes (LARS2, HSD17B4, HARS2, TWNK, ERAL1 and CLPP) are associated with the disease.

See also
 Gonadal dysgenesis

References

External links 

Gynaecologic disorders
Cell surface receptor deficiencies